The District of Columbia Democratic State Committee (DC Dems) is the affiliate of the Democratic Party in the District of Columbia.

As of March 31, 2016, Democrats make up 76 percent of the registered voters in the District of Columbia, while 6 percent are registered with the Republican Party (represented by the District of Columbia Republican Committee), 1 percent with the D.C. Statehood Green Party, less than 1 percent with the Libertarian Party (represented by the Libertarian Party of the District of Columbia), and 17 percent with no party or other.

Current elected officials

U.S. House of Representatives

The District of Columbia is not a U.S. state and therefore has no voting representation. Instead, constituents in the district elect a non-voting delegate to the U.S. House of Representatives. The current delegate is a Democrat.
 : Eleanor Holmes Norton (Delegate to Congress)

City-wide executive officials

District of Columbia has two city-wide elected executive officials: the Mayor & the Attorney General. Both officials are Democrats.
 Mayor: Muriel Bowser
 Attorney General: Brian Schwalb

Council of the District of Columbia

The Council of the District of Columbia is the legislative branch of the local government of the District of Columbia. Democrats hold 11 of the 13 seats in the council.
 Council Chairman: Phil Mendelson
 At-large: Anita Bonds
 At-large: Robert White
 Ward 1: Brianne Nadeau
 Ward 2: Brooke Pinto
 Ward 3: Matthew Frumin
 Ward 4: Janeese Lewis George
 Ward 5: Kenyan McDuffie
 Ward 6: Charles Allen
 Ward 7: Vincent C. Gray
 Ward 8: Trayon White

Shadow congressperson

The posts of shadow United States Senator and shadow United States Representative (not to be confused with the non-voting delegate) are held by elected or appointed government officials from subnational polities of the United States that lack congressional vote. While these officials are not seated in either chamber of Congress, they seek for their subnational polity to gain voting rights in Congress.

In District of Columbia, such officeholders are elected. All of them are Democrats.
Senior United States shadow senator: Paul Strauss (Class II)
Junior United States shadow senator: Mike Brown (Class I)
Shadow representative: Oye Owolewa

Officers
As of January 2020, the committee's officers are:

Chair: Charles Wilson
Vice Chair: Linda Gray
Executive Director: Claudette David
Recording Secretary: Alan Karnofsky
Corresponding Secretary: Alexa Wertman-Brown
Treasurer: Brandon Frye
National Committeewoman: Silvia Martinez
National Committeeman: Jack Evans

References

External links
District of Columbia Democratic State Committee

 
District of Columbia
Democratic Party (United States)
Political parties in the District of Columbia